A Star Is Born may refer to:

Film 
 A Star Is Born (1937 film), starring Janet Gaynor and Fredric March, directed by William A. Wellman
 A Star Is Born (1954 film), starring Judy Garland and James Mason, directed by George Cukor
 A Star Is Born (1976 film), starring Barbra Streisand and Kris Kristofferson, directed by Frank Pierson
 A Star Is Born (2018 film), starring Lady Gaga and Bradley Cooper, directed by Bradley Cooper

Music 
 A Star Is Born (1976 soundtrack), performed by Barbra Streisand and Kris Kristofferson
 "Evergreen (Love Theme from A Star Is Born)", from the 1976 film; performed and co-written by Barbra Streisand
 A Star Is Born (2018 soundtrack), performed by Lady Gaga and Bradley Cooper
 "A Star Is Born" (Jay-Z song), 2009 song by Jay-Z
 "A Star Is Born", a song from the Hercules soundtrack

Television 
 Kokhav Nolad (Hebrew for A Star Is Born), Israeli television series
 Star Tanjō! (Japanese for A Star Is Born), Japanese television series
 Aashiqui 2  (Hindi for Lover-adaptation of 'A Star is Born') Indian movie
 "Stars Are Born", 1951 American television series first aired by DuMont Television Network's flagship station WABD
 A Star is Born, an episode of the PBS Kids animated series WordWorld

See also 
 "A Star Is Born Again", a 2003 episode of The Simpsons
 A Moon Star Is Born, an episode of Sailor Moon
 What Price Hollywood?, a 1932 film starring Constance Bennett and Lowell Sherman, directed by George Cukor; a possible (but not proven) basis for the films
 "Star Born", a 1957 novel by Andre Norton
 Gravitational collapse, the astronomical phenomenon for star formation